Cristian Quintero may refer to:

 Cristian Quintero (swimmer) (born 1992), Venezuelan swimmer
 Cristian Quintero (footballer) (born 1997), Panamanian footballer